The events of 1981 in anime.

Accolades 
Ōfuji Noburō Award: Gauche the Cellist

Releases

See also
1981 in animation

References

External links 
Japanese animated works of the year, listed in the IMDb

Anime
Anime
Years in anime